Reus al Norte is a historic barrio (neighbourhood or district) in Villa Muñoz, Montevideo, Uruguay. 

It was planned and constructed by Emillio Reus as a habitational alternative during the urban expansion of Montevideo in the end of the 19th century. Its design achieved an ideal relation between public and private space. The neighbourhood stands out for its modernist architecture and colourful houses and has become one of the famous sights of Montevideo.

Many people know it by the name Barrio de los Judíos, due to the presence of many Jewish-owned wholesale stores.

References

Barrios of Montevideo
Jews and Judaism in Montevideo